The Visit is the fourth studio album by Loreena McKennitt. Released in 1991, the album has been certified four times platinum in Canada and gold in the United States. It was produced by Loreena McKennitt and Brian Hughes.

The album was a cowinner, with the compilation album Saturday Night Blues, of the 1992 Juno Award for Best Roots and Traditional Album of the Year.

The album was released as a limited edition, numbered, 180 gram vinyl in 2016.

A 30th anniversary edition of the album is slated for release in September, 2021.

Track listing

Song information
 "All Souls Night" derives from McKennitt's merging of the traditions, mythology, and culture of Japan with old Celtic Samhain rituals. The "bonfires" and "figures dancing" are European, the "candles and lanterns" are from Japanese traditions.
 "Bonny Portmore" is a traditional Celtic folk song about oak forest deforestation. It was featured in the soundtrack of Highlander III: The Sorcerer (as well as "Cé Hé Mise le Ulaingt?" and "The Two Trees" from the album "The Mask and Mirror").
 "The Lady of Shalott" is based on the poem The Lady of Shalott by Alfred, Lord Tennyson. However, some poem lines in original poem were removed in McKennitt's version got removed, such as in Part III of the poem, the part "The gemmy bridle glitter'd free...Moves over still Shalott." 
 Contrary to the album notes, "Greensleeves" was not actually written by Henry VIII; though this is a long-held belief and legend.
 "Tango to Evora" was used in the National Film Board of Canada documentary The Burning Times. A cover to the song has been recorded by one of Greece's most popular and respected singers, Haris Alexiou, entitled "Nefeli's Tango", with lyrics written by herself.  Another cover to the song has been recorded by Turkish singer, Nilüfer, entitled "Çok Uzaklarda". Evora is a historical city in Portugal. The song has also been covered by the Iranian singer Ilya Monfared under the title "Gol-e-Orkideh" (Orchid Flower). There is also a Finnish cover, entitled "Katkennut Helminauha" by Finnish singer, Anneli Saaristo and a German cover by Bettina Wegner under the title "Alles was ich wünsche". The Kurdish cover was by Homar Dizayî, under the title "Xozga". There is an Albanian cover, too, entitled "Rrugës i trishtuar" (known also with the title "Sonata"), by the Albanian popular singer Eli Fara. A Romanian cover of the song, named “Tango pentru Evora” (Romanian translation of ”Tango to Evora”) was sung during the show “Dansez pentru tine” by Mălina Olinescu. The lyrics were written by Florin Busuioc.
 "Cymbeline" is taken from a song in the William Shakespeare play Cymbeline.
 Lyrics from "The Old Ways" are featured in the letter that Rachel Green writes to Ross Geller in the Friends fourth-season premier episode The One with the Jellyfish. While the contents of the letter are not displayed on screen, the letter is on exhibit in the touring The Friends Experience exhibition.

Personnel
 Loreena McKennitt – synthesizer, piano, harp, accordion, bodhran, vocals, arranger, producer, adaptation
 Anne Bourne – cello
 Al Cross – drums
 Tom Hazlett – bass
 Brian Hughes – balalaika, electric & acoustic guitar, assistant engineer, assistant producer
 Patrick Hutchinson – uillean pipes
 George Koller – bass, cello, mad fiddle, tamboura, sitar
 Rick Lazar – percussion, udu drum
 Hugh Marsh – fiddle

Other personnel
 Jeff Wolpert – engineer, mixing, assistant producer

Certifications

!scope="row"|Worldwide
|
|1,400,000
|-

References

1991 albums
Loreena McKennitt albums
Warner Records albums